The 1952–53 AHL season was the 17th season of the American Hockey League. The league loses two teams, bringing an end to East & West Divisions. The F. G. "Teddy" Oke Trophy is now awarded to the regular season champions. Seven teams played 64 games each in the schedule. The Cleveland Barons won their ninth Oke Trophy, and their sixth Calder Cup.

Team changes
 The Indianapolis Capitals cease operations.
 The Cincinnati Mohawks transfer to the International Hockey League.

Final standings
Note: GP = Games played; W = Wins; L = Losses; T = Ties; GF = Goals for; GA = Goals against; Pts = Points;

Scoring leaders

Note: GP = Games played; G = Goals; A = Assists; Pts = Points; PIM = Penalty minutes

 complete list

Calder Cup playoffs
First round
Cleveland Barons defeated Syracuse Warriors 3 games to 1.
Pittsburgh Hornets defeated Hershey Bears 3 games to 0.
Finals
Cleveland Barons defeated Pittsburgh Hornets 4 games to 3, to win the Calder Cup. 
 list of scores

Trophy and Award winners
Team Awards

Individual Awards

See also
List of AHL seasons

References
AHL official site
AHL Hall of Fame
HockeyDB

American Hockey League seasons
AHL